The 201920 Australian bushfire season or Black Summer was a period of bushfires in many parts of Australia, which, due to its unusual intensity, size, duration, and uncontrollable dimension, is considered a megafire. The Australian National University reported that the area burned in 2019–2020 was "well below average" due to low fuel levels and fire activity in unpopulated parts of Northern Australia, but that "Despite low fire activity overall, vast forest fires occurred in southeast Australia from southeast Queensland to Kangaroo Island."

In June 2019 the Queensland Fire and Emergency Service acting director warned of the potential for an early start to the bushfire season which normally starts in August. The warning was based on the Northern Australia bushfire seasonal outlook noting exceptional dry conditions and a lack of soil moisture, combined with early fires in central Queensland. Throughout the summer, hundreds of fires burnt, mainly in the southeast of the country. The major fires peaked during December–January.

, the fires burnt an estimated , destroyed over 3,000 buildings (including 2,779 homes) and killed at least 34 people. It was claimed that three billion terrestrial vertebratesthe vast majority being reptileswere affected and some endangered species were believed to be driven to extinction. At its peak, air quality dropped to hazardous levels in all southern and eastern states. The cost of dealing with the bushfires is expected to exceed the 4.4 billion of the 2009 Black Saturday fires, and tourism sector revenues fell by more than 1 billion. Economists estimated that the Australian bushfires may cost over 78-88 billion in property damage and economic losses, making the bushfires Australia's costliest natural disaster to date. Nearly 80 percent of Australians were affected either directly or indirectly by the bushfires. A September 2021 study using satellite data estimated the CO2 emissions of the fires from November 2019 to January 2020 to be ~715 million tons, about twice as much as earlier estimates and surpassing Australia's normal annual bushfire and fossil fuel emissions by ~80%.

From September 2019 to March 2020, fires heavily impacted various regions of the state of New South Wales. In eastern and north-eastern Victoria large areas of forest burnt out of control for four weeks before the fires emerged from the forests in late December. Multiple states of emergency were declared across New South Wales, Victoria, and the Australian Capital Territory. Reinforcements from all over Australia were called in to assist fighting the fires and relieve exhausted local crews in New South Wales. The Australian Defence Force was mobilised to provide air support to the firefighting effort and to provide manpower and logistical support. Firefighters, supplies and equipment from Canada, New Zealand, Singapore and the United States, among others, helped fight the fires, especially in New South Wales.

During the ensuing crisis, an air tanker and two helicopters crashed during firefighting operations, the air tanker crash resulting in the deaths of the three crew. Two fire trucks were caught in fatal incidents caused directly by fire conditions, killing three fire fighters.

By 4 March 2020 all fires in New South Wales had been extinguished completely (to the point where there were no fires in the state for the first time since July 2019), and the Victoria fires had all been contained. The last fire of the season occurred in Lake Clifton, Western Australia, in early May.

There has been considerable debate regarding the underlying cause of the intensity and scale of the fires, including the role of fire management practices and climate change, which during the peak of the crisis attracted significant international attention, despite previous Australian fires burning much larger areas (1974–75) or killing more people (2008–09). Politicians visiting fire impacted areas received mixed responses, in particular Prime Minister Scott Morrison. An estimated 500 million was donated by the public at large, international organisations, public figures and celebrities for victim relief and wildlife recovery. Convoys of donated food, clothing and livestock feed were sent to affected areas.

In 2021 the documentary film Burning by Eva Orner addressed the 2019–2020 Australian bushfires from several different perspectives. The film places particular focus on the inactions of Prime Minister Scott Morrison.

Overview
Starting from late July early August 2019, fires heavily impacted various regions of the state of New South Wales, such as the North Coast, Mid North Coast, the Hunter Region, the Hawkesbury and the Wollondilly in Sydney's far west, the Blue Mountains, Illawarra and the South Coast, Riverina and Snowy Mountains with more than 100 fires burnt across the state. In eastern and north-eastern Victoria, large areas of forest burnt out of control for four weeks before the fires emerged from the forests in late December, taking lives, threatening many towns and isolating Corryong and Mallacoota. A state of disaster was declared for East Gippsland. Significant fires occurred in the Adelaide Hills and Kangaroo Island in South Australia and parts of the ACT. Moderately affected areas were south-eastern Queensland and areas of south-western Western Australia, with a few areas in Tasmania being mildly impacted.

On 12 November 2019 catastrophic fire danger was declared in the Greater Sydney region for the first time since the introduction of this level in 2009 and a total fire ban was in place for seven regions of New South Wales, including Greater Sydney. The Illawarra and Greater Hunter areas also experienced catastrophic fire dangers, and so did other parts of the state, including the already fire ravaged parts of northern New South Wales. The political ramifications of the fire season have been significant. A decision by the New South Wales Government to cut funding to fire services based on budget estimates, as well as a holiday taken by Australian Prime Minister Scott Morrison, during a period in which two volunteer firefighters died, and his perceived apathy towards the situation, resulted in controversy.

,  had burnt or was burning across all Australian states and territories. Ecologists from The University of Sydney estimated 480 million mammals, birds, and reptiles were lost since September with concerns that entire species of plants and animals may have been wiped out by bushfire, later expanded to more than a billion.

In February 2020 it was reported that researchers from Charles Sturt University found that the deaths of nine smoky mice were from "severe lung disease" caused by smoke haze that contained PM2.5 particles coming from bushfires 50 kilometres away.

By the time the fires had been extinguished there, they destroyed 2,448 homes, as well as 284 facilities and more than 5,000 outbuildings in New South Wales alone. Twenty-six people were confirmed to have been killed in New South Wales since October. The last fatality reported was on 23 January 2020 following the death of a man near Moruya.

In New South Wales, the fires burnt through more land than any other blazes in the past 25 years, in addition to being the state's worst bushfire season on record. In comparison, the 2018 California wildfires consumed  and the 2019 Amazon rainforest wildfires burnt  of land.

Whereas these bushfires are regarded by the NSW Rural Fire Service as the worst bushfire season in memory for that state, the 1974–75 bushfires were nationally much larger consuming . However, due to their lower intensity and remote location, the 1974 fires caused around 5 million (approximately 36.5 million in 2020) in damage. In December 2019 the New South Wales Government declared a state of emergency after record-breaking temperatures and prolonged drought exacerbated the bushfires.

Due to safety concerns and significant public pressure, New Year's Eve fireworks displays were cancelled across New South Wales including highly popular events at Campbelltown, Liverpool, Parramatta, and across Sydney's Northern Beaches, and as well in the nation's capital of Canberra. As temperatures reached , the New South Wales Premier Gladys Berejiklian called a fresh seven-day state of emergency with effect from 9 am on 3 January 2020.

On 23 January 2020, a Lockheed C-130 Hercules air tanker (N134CG) crashed at Peak View near Cooma while waterbombing a blaze. The aircraft was destroyed, resulting in the death of the three American crew members on board. It was one of eleven large air tankers brought to Australia for the fire season from Canada and US. Reaching the crash site proved difficult due to the active bushfires in the area. An investigation was begun by the Australian Transport Safety Bureau (ATSB) to determine the cause of the accident.

A preliminary ATSB report was released on 28 February. One fact determined was that the cockpit voice recorder (CVR) was faulty and " … had not recorded any audio from the accident flight."  the investigation had not been completed.

On 31 January 2020, the Australian Capital Territory declared a state of emergency in areas around Canberra as several bushfires threatened the city, having burnt .

On 7 February 2020, it was reported that torrential rain across most of south-east Australia had extinguished a third of extant fires; with only a small number of uncontrolled fires remaining by 10 February.

Fire potential 
The Garnaut Climate Change Review of 2008 stated:

To describe emerging fire trends the study by Lucas and others defined two new fire weather categories, "very extreme" and "catastrophic".

The analysis by the Bushfire CRC, the Australian Bureau of Meteorology, and CSIRO Marine and Atmospheric Research found that the number of "very high" fire danger days generally increases 2–13% by 2020 for the low scenarios (global increase by ) and 10–30% for the high scenarios (global increase by ). The number of "extreme" fire danger days generally increases 5–25% by 2020 for the low scenarios and 15–65% for the high scenarios.

In April 2019 a group of former Australian fire services chiefs, Emergency Leaders for Climate Action, warned that Australia was not prepared for the upcoming fire season. They called on the next prime minister to meet the former emergency service leaders "who will outline, unconstrained by their former employers, how climate change risks are rapidly escalating". Greg Mullins, the second-longest serving fire and rescue commissioner in New South Wales and now a councillor with the Climate Council, said he thought the coming summer was going to be "the worst I have ever seen" for fire crews, and renewed his calls for the government to take urgent action to address climate change and stop Australia's rising emissions.

In August 2019 the federally funded Bushfire and Natural Hazards CRC published a seasonal outlook report which advised of "above normal fire potential" for southern and southeast Queensland, the east coast areas of New South Wales and Victoria, for parts of Western Australia and South Australia. In December 2019, the Bushfire and Natural Hazards CRC updated their advice of "above normal fire potential".

Regions affected

New South Wales

The NSW statutory Bush Fire Danger Period normally begins on 1 October and continues through until 31 March. In 2019–20, the fire season started early with drought affecting 95 percent of the state and persistent dry and warm conditions across the state. Twelve local government areas started the Bush Fire Danger Period two months early, on 1 August 2019, and nine more started on 17 August 2019. In the week preceding 10 February 2020, a wide band of heavy rain swept through most of coastal New South Wales, extinguishing a significant number of fires; it left 33 active fires, of which five were uncontrolled, all located in the Bega Valley and Snowy Mountains regions.

North Coast
On 6 September 2019, the northern parts of the state experienced extreme fire dangers. Fires included the Long Gully Road fire near Drake which burnt until the end of October, killing two people and destroying 43 homes; the Mount McKenzie Road fire which burnt across the southern outskirts of Tenterfield, and severely injured one person, destroyed one home and badly damaged four homes; and the Bees Nest fire near Ebor which burnt until 12 November and destroyed seven homes.

Smaller fires in the area include the Myall Creek Road fire.

Mid North Coast
In the Port Macquarie-Hastings area, the first fire was reported at Lindfield Park on 18 July 2019, burning in dry peat swamp and threatened homes at Sovereign Hills and crossed the Pacific Highway at Sancrox. In the Port Macquarie suburb of Crestwood a fire started on 26 October from a dry electrical storm. Water bombers were delayed the following day in attempts to bring the fire burning in swampland to the south west of Port Macquarie under control. A back burn on 28 October got away from New South Wales Rural Fire Service (NSWRFS) volunteers after a sudden wind change pushing the fire south towards Lake Cathie and west over Lake Innes. Port Macquarie and surrounding areas were blanketed in thick smoke on 29 October with ongoing fire activity over the following week caused the sky to have an orange glow. 
A fire burnt in wilderness areas on the Carrai Plateau west of Kempsey. This fire joined up with the Stockyard Creek fire and together with the Coombes Gap fire and swept east towards Willawarrin, Temagog, Birdwood, Yarras, Bellangary, Kindee and Upper Rollands Plains. Land around Nowendoc and Yarrowich was also burnt.

North-west of  near the Cattai Wetlands a fire started on 28 October, this fire threatened the towns of Harrington, Crowdy Head and Johns River as it burnt north towards Dunbogan.

At Hillville, a fire grew large due to hot and windy conditions, resulting in disorder in the nearby town of Taree, to the north. Buses were called in early to take students home before the fire threat became too dangerous. On 9 November 2019, the fire reached Old Bar and Wallabi Point, threatening many properties. The following two days saw the fire reach Tinonee and Taree South, threatening the Taree Service Centre. Water bombers dropped water on the facility to protect it. The fire briefly turned in the direction of Nabiac before wind pushed it towards Failford. Other communities affected included Rainbow Flat, Khappinghat, Kooringhat and Purfleet. A spot fire jumped into Ericsson Lane, threatening businesses. It ultimately burnt .

At Dingo Tops National Park a small fire that started in the vicinity of Rumba Dump Fire Trail burned down the ranges and impacted the small communities of Caparra and Bobin. Fanned by near catastrophic conditions, the fire grew considerably on 8 November 2019 and consumed nearly everything in its path. The small community of Caparra lost fourteen homes in a few hours as the bushfire continued towards the small village of Bobin, where numerous homes and the Bobin Public School were destroyed in the fire. Fourteen homes were lost on one street in Bobin. The NSWRFS sent out alerts to people in Killabakh, Upper Lansdowne, Kippaxs, Elands, and Marlee to monitor conditions.

2019 Rally Australia, planned to be the final round of the 2019 World Rally Championship, was a motor racing event scheduled to be held in Coffs Harbour across 14–17 November. A week before the rally was due to begin, the bushfire began to affect the region surrounding Coffs Harbour, with event organisers shortening the event in response to the deteriorating conditions. With the situation worsening, repeated calls from competitors (most of which were European-based) to cancel the event prevailed with the event cancelled on 12 November.

In late December 2019, fires started on both sides of the Pacific Highway around the Coopernook region. They burnt  before they were brought under control.

Hunter

In the Hunter region, the Kerry Ridge fire burnt in the Wollemi National Park, Nullo Mountain, Coricudgy and Putty state forests in the Mid-Western Region, Muswellbrook and Singleton local government areas.

Blue Mountains and Hawkesbury

The fire was projected to burn towards the Central Coast and potentially threaten properties in Wisemans Ferry and other townships. Due to heavy fuel loads and erratic weather conditions, the backburn quickly grew out of control, threatening houses in Mount Wilson and Mount Irvine. The fire eventually jumped Mount Irvine Road and on 15 December, under deteriorating conditions, the fire impacted Mount Tomah, Berambing and Bilpin. The fire destroyed numerous houses and buildings in this area, and then jumped the Bells Line of Road into the Grose Valley.

On 21 December, a catastrophic day, the Grose Valley fire impacted Mount Victoria, Bell, Dargan and Bilpin with resultant destruction of dozens of homes. On the same days both the Gospers Mountain fire and the Grose Valley fire moved towards . Back burning operations were put in place to save Kurrajong and surrounds and to save all Blue Mountains towns from Katoomba to Winmalee.

On 10 February 2020, NSW Rural Fire Service announced a torrential rain event over the preceding week had extinguished the Gospers Mountain fire.

Smaller fires in the area include the Erskine Creek fire.

The Gospers Mountain fire was the largest forest fire ever recorded in Australia, burning more than 500,000 hectares.

Sydney

On 12 November 2019, under Sydney's first ever catastrophic fire conditions, a fire broke out in the Lane Cove National Park south of Turramurra. Under strong winds and extreme heat the fire spread rapidly, growing out of control and impacting the suburban interface across South Turramurra. One house caught alight in Lyon Avenue, but was saved by quick responding firefighters. As further crews arrived and worked to protect properties, a C-130 Air Tanker made several fire retardant drops directly over firefighters and houses, saving the rest of the suburb. The fire was ultimately brought under control several hours later, with one firefighter injured suffering a broken arm.

Because of the bushfires occurring in the surrounding regions, the Sydney metropolitan area suffered from dangerous smoky haze for several days throughout December, with the air quality being eleven times the hazardous level on some days, making it even worse than New Delhi's, where it was also compared to "smoking 32 cigarettes" by Associate Professor Brian Oliver, a respiratory diseases scientist at the University of Technology Sydney.

The fire continued to flare up sporadically, coming out of the dense bush and threatening properties in Oakdale and Buxton on 14 and 15 December. The fire moved south-east towards the populated areas of the Southern Highlands and impacted the townships of Balmoral, Bargo, Couridjah and Tahmoor in far south-western Sydney. Substantial property losses occurred across these areas, in particular multiple fire trucks were overrun by fire, with several firefighters taken to hospital and two airlifted in critical condition. Later that night, two firefighters were killed when a tree fell onto the road and their tanker rolled, injuring three other crew members. The situation deteriorated on 21 December when the fire changed direction and attacked Balmoral and Buxton once more from the opposite side, with major property losses in both areas. On New Year's Eve there were fears of this fire impacting the towns of Mittagong, Braemar, and surrounding areas.

On 31 December 2019, a grass fire broke out in the sloped woodlands of Prospect Hill, in Western Sydney, where it headed north towards Pemulwuy along the Prospect Highway. The fire impacted a large industrial area and threatened numerous properties before being brought under control by 9:30 pm. Approximately  and a number of historic Monterey pine trees were burnt.

The Sydney City fireworks display was allowed to continue with a special exemption from fire authorities, despite protests. Despite warnings from authorities, numerous fires were sparked across Sydney as a result of illegal fireworks, including a blaze which threatened properties at Cecil Hills in Sydney's south west.

On 4 January 2020, Sydney's western suburb Penrith recorded its hottest day on record at  making it the hottest place on Earth at the time.

On 5 January 2020, a fire broke out in bushland at Voyager Point in Sydney's south-west, spreading rapidly under a strong southerly wind and impacting numerous houses in Voyager Point and Hammondville. As the fire moved north, authorities closed the M5 Motorway due to smoke conditions and prepared for the fire to impact the New Brighton housing estate.

Southern Highlands
In late October 2019, a number of fires started in remote bushland near Lake Burragorang in the Kanangra-Boyd National Park south-west of Sydney. Due to the extreme isolation of the area and rugged inaccessible terrain, firefighters struggled to contain the fires as they began to spread through the dense bushland. These multiple fires ultimately all merged to become the Green Wattle Creek fire. The fire continued to grow in size and intensity, burning towards the township of Yerranderie. Firefighters undertook backburning around the town whilst helicopters and fixed wing aircraft worked to control the spread of the fire. The fire passed Yerranderie but continued to burn through the national park towards south-western Sydney. On 5 December under severe weather conditions, the fire jumped the Lake Burragorang and began burning towards populated areas within the Wollondilly area.

On 19 December 2019, the fire continued east towards the Hume Highway (resulting in its closure for several hours), impacting the township of Yanderra.

As well as expanding to the south and east, the fire also spread in a westerly direction, headed towards . The Oberon Correctional Centre was evacuated in anticipation of the advancing fire impact along its western flank. On 2 January, the fire hit the popular and historic Jenolan Caves area, destroying multiple buildings including the local fire station. The centrepiece of the precinct, Jenolan Caves House, was saved. On 10 February 2020, NSW Rural Fire Service announced a torrential rain event over the preceding week had extinguished the Green Wattle Creek fire.

South Coast

On 30 December 2019 weather conditions drastically deteriorated across the south-eastern areas of the state, with major fires breaking out and escalating in the Dampier State Forest, Deua River Valley, Badja, Bemboka, Wyndham, Talmalolma and Ellerslie, hampering firefighters already stretched by the Currowan, Palerang and Clyde Mountain fires. As temperatures were forecast to reach  on the South Coast, Premier Berejiklian declared a seven-day state of emergency on 2 January 2020 with effect from 9am on the following day, including an unprecedented  "tourist leave zone" from Nowra to the edge of Victoria's northern border.

A blaze on the South Coast started off at Currowan and travelled up to the coastline after jumping across the Princes Highway, threatening properties around Termeil. Residents in Bawley Point, Kioloa, Depot Beach, Pebbly Beach, Durras North and Pretty Beach were told to either evacuate to Batemans Bay or Ulladulla or stay to protect their property. One home was lost. The Currowan fire had merged with the Tianjara fire in the Morton National Park to the south west of Nowra; and the Charleys Forest fire had grown along the fire's western flank; and on the fire's southern flank, the fire had merged with the Clyde Mountain fire.

By 26 December 2019, the Clyde Mountain fire was burning on the southern side of the Kings Highway, into the Buckenbowra and Runnyford areas. Around 4am on 31 December, the fire had crossed the Princes Highway near , and the highway was closed between Batemans Bay and Moruya. Around 7am on 31 December, the fire impacted the southern side of Batemans Bay, causing the loss of around ten businesses and damage to many others. The fire also crossed the Princes Highway in the vicinity of Round Hill and impacted the residential suburbs of Catalina, as well as beach suburbs from Sunshine Bay to Broulee. Residents and holiday makers were forced to flee to the beaches. On 23 January this fire escalated back to emergency level as the blaze roared towards the coastal town of Moruya, a town largely unaffected by bushfires in recent weeks.

At nearby Conjola Park, numerous homes were lost as the embers jumped across Conjola Lake, landing in gutters and lighting up houses. On one street there were only four houses still standing. , at least two people died and a woman was missing. Isolated hamlets of Bendalong and Manyana and Cunjurong Point were additionally ablaze, with holiday-makers evacuated on 3 January 2020. , all are still without power.

Part of the fire was burning in inaccessible country and continued to head in a north-westerly direction towards Bombala as well as northerly to just south of Nethercote. On 2 February 2020 in the Bega Valley, the  Border fire pushed north, while three other bushfires in the south-west had merged into one. Kristy McBain, the Bega Valley shire council mayor, said more than 400 properties and homes had been lost after 34 days of fire activity in the area.

On 9 February 2020, NSW Rural Fire Service announced a torrential rain event over the preceding week had extinguished both the Morton and Currowan fires, with the latter having burnt  over 74 days and destroying 312 homes.

Riverina
On 30 December 2019, the Green Valley fire burning east of Albury near Talmalmo (which had started the day prior) developed into an unprecedented fire event for the Snowy Valleys as a result of extreme local conditions. The smoke plume rose to an estimated  and developed a pyro-cumulonimbus cloud, becoming a firestorm.

Firefighters described what they believed to be a tornado generated by the fire storm, which began flattening trees and flipped a small fire vehicle. The tornado then impacted a crew of firefighters working to protect a property, flipping their tanker over and trapping the crew inside, who were then overrun by fire. One firefighter was killed with multiple others injured, with one airlifted to Melbourne and two to Sydney.

Snowy Mountains
The Dunns Road fire was believed to have been started by a lightning strike on 28 December in a private pine plantation near Adelong. In the Snowy Valleys local government area, by 2 January 2020 the Dunns Road fire had burnt south of the Snowy Mountains Highway in the Ellerslie Range near . Over  was burnt and the fire was out of control. The NSWRFS issued an evacuation order to residents in the Batlow and Wondalga areas. Residents and visitors to the Kosciuszko National Park were evacuated and the national park was closed. 155 inmates from the Mannus Correctional Centre near Tumbarumba were evacuated.

On 3 January 2020, the Dunns Road fire burnt from Batlow into Kosciuszko National Park, burning much of the northern part of the park. The fire caused significant damage, severely damaging the Selwyn Snow Resort, destroying structures in the town of Cabramurra and almost completely destroying the heritage-listed precinct (and birthplace of skiing in Australia) of Kiandra. Kiandra's historic former courthouse was left with only its walls standing after a fire so hot that the glass and aluminium in the windows melted. A number of high country huts, including Wolgal Hut and Pattinsons Hut near Kiandra, were also feared to have been destroyed. By 11 January three fires had mergedthe Dunns Road fire, the East Ournie Creek, and the Riverina's Green Valley fireand had created a  "mega-fire", burning south of the Snowy Mountains.

On 23 January 2020, a Lockheed C-130 Hercules large air tanker crashed near Cooma while waterbombing a blaze, resulting in the death of the three American crew members on board.

On 1 February 2020, emergency warnings were issued for the Orroral fire and the Clear Range fire threatening Bredbo north of Cooma.

Victoria
On 21 November 2019, lightning strikes ignited a series of fires in East Gippsland, initially endangering the communities of Buchan, Buchan South and Sunny Point. On 20 December, the Marthavale-Barmouth Spur expanded, greatly endangering the community of Tambo Crossing.

The first day of two-day cricket tour match between a Victoria XI and New Zealand in Melbourne was cancelled due to extreme heat conditions.

An evacuation warning was issued for the East Gippsland town of Goongerah, which is surrounded by high-value old growth forests, as well as Cudgewa. On the same day, a fire broke out in the Plenty Gorge Parklands, situated in Melbourne's northern suburbs between Bundoora, Mill Park, South Morang, Greensborough and Plenty.

Fires reached the town of Mallacoota by around 8 am AEDT on 31 December 2019. At 11 am AEDT 31 December, fires had begun to approach the vacation town of Lakes Entrance. Despite the recommendation that large portions of East Gippsland be evacuated, approximately 30,000 holiday makers chose to remain in the region. Approximately 4,000 people, including 3,000 tourists, remained in Mallacoota as the fire began making its closest approach to the town, cutting off roads in the process; Mallacoota had not been issued with an evacuation warning on 29 December. On 3 January, approximately 1,160 people from Mallacoota were evacuated on naval vessels HMAS Choules and MV Sycamore.

On 2 January 2020 at 11 pm AEDT, Victorian Premier Daniel Andrews declared a state of disaster under the provisions of the Victorian Emergency Management Act for the shires of East Gippsland, Mansfield, Wellington, Wangaratta, Towong, and Alpine, and the alpine resorts of Mount Buller, Mount Hotham, and Mount Stirling. Emergency Management Commissioner Andrew Crisp stated that  had burnt including  near Corryong in the state's north-east and that fifty fires were burning. On 3 January, Andrews said two people were confirmed dead from the East Gippsland fires.

On 6 January 2020, Andrews said that bushfires had burnt through  in Victoria's east and north-east and that 200 homes were confirmed lost.

On 13 January 2020, two bushfires were burning at emergency level in Victoria despite milder conditions, one about 8 km east of Abbeyard and the other in East Gippsland affecting Tamboon, Tamboon South and Furnel.

On 23 January 2020, there were still 12 fires burning in Victoria, the strongest in East Gippsland and the north-east. The Buldah fire in East Gippsland was at watch and act level and the rest were on advice level. Most of the 44 fires sparked by dry lightning were quickly dealt with by firefighters. Heavy rain in the Melbourne region brought little relief to bushfire-affected regions. Andrews said that the rains could bring new dangers for firefighters, including landslides.

On 30 and 31 January 2020, very hot weather occurred in Victoria, New South Wales and South Australia that brought high fire danger with several uncontrolled bushfires still burning. An Emergency Warning was issued for Bendoc, Bendoc Upper, and Bendoc North on 30 January.

On 20 February 2020, the huge East Gippsland bushfire that had burned for three months was declared "contained" by Bairnsdale incident controller Brett Mitchell. Recent rainfall also contributed to the Omeo, Anglers Rest, Cobungra, Bindi, Hotham Heights, Glen Valley, Benambra, Swifts Creek, Omeo, Ensay, Tongio, the Blue Rag Range, Dargo and Tabberabbera bushfires all being contained.  The Snowy complex fire in the far east was the single major remaining fire still burning in Victoria.

All significant fires in Victoria, including the Snowy Complex fire, were declared contained on 27 February 2020.

Queensland

On the following day the heritage-listed lodge and cabins at the iconic Australian nature-based Binna Burra Lodge were destroyed in the bushfire that consumed residential houses in Beechmont the previous day.

A large fire impacted the Peregian Beach area on 9 September, on the Sunshine Coast, severely damaging ten houses. In December 2019 Peregian Springs and the surrounding areas came under threat by bushfires for the second time in a couple of months. No homes were confirmed lost in this bushfire.

Due to deteriorating fire conditions and fires threatening homes across the state, on 9 November a State of Fire Emergency was declared across 42 local government areas across southern, central, northern and far-northern Queensland. 14 homes were destroyed in the Yeppoon area during mid November 2019.

On 27 October a fire started in inaccessible Defence land at the Canungra Military Area.  Firefighters attempted to contain the fire with extensive water bombing until weather conditions improved.  On 8 November, the fire broke through the containment line and impacted 30 houses in Lower Beechmont, resulting in the evacuation of the village.  All houses were saved, though a shed and several outbuildings were lost.

At 8 am the air quality in Brisbane reached unprecedentedly poor levels (Woolloongabba PM2.5 238.8 μg/m3). Queensland's chief health officer, Dr Jeannette Young, urged residents to stay indoors and to not physically exert themselves.

On 13 November a water bombing helicopter crashed while fighting the blazes threatening the small community of Pechey. While the Bell 214 helicopter was completely destroyed, the pilot walked away with minor injuries.

On 23 November the state of fire emergency was revoked and extended fire bans were put in place in local government areas that were previously affected under this declaration.

On 6 December a house fire broke out in Bundamba and quickly spread to nearby bushland and was placed under a watch and act alert by the Queensland Fire and Emergency Services that afternoon. The following day, after worsening conditions, the fire was upgraded to an emergency warning and began to threaten homes in the local community. The fire destroyed a shipping container filled with fireworks, and residents within the  exclusion zone were ordered to evacuate. One home was destroyed.

On 8 November a bushfire broke out in forestry to the west of the township of Jimna, causing Queensland Fire and Emergency services to issue a "watch and act" alert. The fire caused the evacuation of the entire town.

South Australia
On 11 November 2019 an emergency bushfire warning was issued for Port Lincoln in the Eyre Peninsula, with an uncontrolled fire travelling towards the town. The South Australian Country Fire Service ordered ten water bombers to the area to assist 26 ground crews at the scene. SA Power Networks disconnected power to the town.

The fire was believed to have started from a sparking electrical transformer. A Boeing 737 water-bombing aircraft from New South Wales in addition to South Australian Air Tractor AT-802s were used to protect the town of Edithburgh.

On 20 December fires took hold in the Adelaide Hills, and near  in the Mount Lofty Ranges. The fires killed one person, more than 70 houses were destroyed, as well as over 400 outbuildings and 200 cars. Yearly Christmas celebrations at Lobethal were cancelled. volunteers from around the Adelaide and Mount Lofty Ranges areas responded to the unfolding incident; this resulted in a number of fire trucks being overrun by the fast moving fire. One of the trucks involved was Seaford 34. The crews were attempting to prevent the fire from crossing Croft Rd at Cudlee Creek when a wind change pushed the fire front towards them. The crews took shelter in their truck until the fire front passed. The crews were taken back to Lobethal were they continued to assist community members whilst on foot with asset protection as the fire front moved through.
Also on 20 December, an out-of-control bushfire took hold near Angle Vale, starting from the Northern Expressway and burning through Buchfelde and across the Gawler River. At 11:07 am ACDT the fire was burning under catastrophic weather conditions and an emergency warning was issued for Hillier, Munno Para Downs, Kudla, Munno Para West and Angle Vale. One house was destroyed.

Another emergency warning was issued on 3 January for a fire near Kersbrook. At its largest extent, the warning area overlapped with areas that a few days earlier had been in warnings for the Cudlee Creek fire.

Fires remained burning out of control, with firefighters working to contain and control fires before potentially hot windy weather scheduled for later in the week. Following fire damage to a water treatment plant, residents were asked to conserve water and some water was carted into island towns. There were concerns for the future of threatened wildlife, such as glossy black cockatoos, Kangaroo Island dunnarts, and koalas. Authorities stated that any koalas taken to the mainland for treatment cannot return to the island in case they bring diseases back with them.

Western Australia

Two bushfires burnt in Geraldton on 13 November, damaging homes and small structures.

A fire broke out in Yanchep at 2:11 pm on 11 December, immediately triggering an emergency warning for Yanchep and Two Rocks. The fire led to a service station exploding. On 12 December, temperatures in excess of  exacerbated the fire, and the emergency warning area doubled including parts of Guilderton and Brenton Bay further north. By 16 December, the fire was considered contained and the alert downgraded to watch and act. Approximately  were burnt; only two buildings were damaged, both within the first day of the fire starting.

In December fires in the region around Norseman blocked access to the Eyre Highway and the Nullarbor Plain and caused the highways of the region to be blocked, so as to prevent any recurrence of the 2007 death of truck drivers on the Great Eastern Highway.

Between 26 December 2019 and 1 January 2020, as a result of a lightning strike, a fire tore through  of land in Stirling Range National Park in the southwest of the state, burning more than half of the park. By New Year's Day 2020 a crew of 200 firefighters brought the fire back to advice level without any loss of life or major property damage (a park ranger hut and hiking tracks were destroyed). However, conservationists raised concerns for the potential loss of rare and unique flora and fauna that live in the park, which contains over 1500 such species within its boundaries, including a rare population of quokkas (one of few in mainland Western Australia). A local politician, firefighters, farmers and tourism operators called on Western Australian Emergency Minister Fran Logan to invest in local firefighting assets for the area to make sure the tourist destination was properly protected.

The last fire of Western Australian 2019–20 bushfire season started in Lake Clifton, within the Shire of Waroona, on 2 May and was extinguished on 3 May. The Lake Clifton area was severely damaged during the 2010–11 bushfire season.

Tasmania
In late October 2019, four bushfires were burning near Scamander, Elderslie, and Lachlan. Emergency warnings were issued at Lulworth, Bothwell, and Lachlan. Lightning strikes subsequently started multiple fires in Southwest Tasmania.

Two fires continued to burn in January 2020.

Australian Capital Territory

In the Australian Capital Territory (ACT), the national capital Canberra was blanketed by thick bushfire smoke on New Year's Day from bushfires burning nearby in New South Wales. That day the air quality in the capital was the worst of any city in the world, at around 23 times the threshold to be considered hazardous. Conditions continued the next day, and Australia Post stopped postal deliveries in the ACT to keep workers safe from smoke. The first death directly linked to the poor air quality was also recorded on 2 January. An elderly woman had been travelling from Brisbane to Canberra by plane. When she exited the plane onto the smoke-flooded tarmac, she suffered respiratory distress and then died. On 2 January 2020, the ACT declared a state of alert; that was extended on 12 January as the merged Dunns Road fire burnt  from the Territory's south-west border. Smoke from nearby bushfires continued to severely impact Canberra's air quality intermittently throughout January 2020.

From at least 6 January 2020 a bushfire near Hospital Hill in the Namadgi National Park had started; it was extinguished on 9 January.

Canberra Airport was closed for a day. The fire destroyed one facility, four outbuildings, and three vehicles.

On 27 January 2020 a bushfire started in the Orroral Valley in the Namadgi National Park. At 1:30 pm, an Army MRH-90 Taipan helicopter conducting reconnaissance for landing sites for remote area firefighting teams attempted to land for a break when their landing light ignited a fire in dry grass. The aircrew waited until landing at Canberra Airport at about 2:15 pm to notify the ACT Emergency Services Agency meanwhile a fire tower had spotted white smoke at 1:49 pm and a search had commenced to locate the fire. An emergency warning was declared for Tharwa and the southern suburbs of Canberra – particularly Banks, Gordon, and Conder — just after 1:30 pm AEST on 28 January. Chief Minister Andrew Barr described the fire as the biggest threat to Canberra since the 2003 Canberra bushfires. At midday on 31 January, Barr declared a state of emergency for the ACT, the first time such action had occurred since the 2003 fires. As the Orroral Valley Fire burned out of control, many instances of ‘disaster tourism’ were reported from suburban south Tuggeranong, with people driving to the suburbs to see the fire and take photographs; in turn blocking traffic. The Orroral Valley fire was downgraded to "advice" status on 5 February and declared to be out on 27 February.

Northern Territory 
The Northern Territory went through a relatively average annual bushfire season with respect to area of land burnt, in comparison to the scale of bushfires witnessed in other areas of Australia. Five homes were lost to bushfires in the Territory.

Precedents 

There have been a number of large scale bushfires recorded in Australian history. The widespread 1938-9 fires in Victoria, NSW, South Australia and the ACT similarly gained international headlines when the fires entered the Sydney suburbs, as did the 1994 eastern seaboard fires. The 1851 Black Thursday bushfires shocked colonial Australia with their ferocity, burning a quarter of what is now Victoria (around ). NSW was again badly affected, and three people killed. However, the fires were mainly in sparsely populated inland areas. The five most deadly blazes were: Black Saturday 2009 in Victoria (173 people killed, 2000 homes lost); Ash Wednesday 1983 in Victoria and South Australia (75 dead, nearly 1900 homes); Black Friday 1939 in Victoria (71 dead, 650 houses destroyed), Black Tuesday 1967 in Tasmania (62 people and almost 1300 homes); and the Gippsland fires and Black Sunday of 1926 in Victoria (60 people killed over a two-month period).

Nationally, Australian National University described the 2019 fire year as "close to average" and the 2020 fire year as "unusually small".

Environmental effects

In mid-December 2019, a NASA analysis revealed that since 1 August, the New South Wales and Queensland bushfires had emitted  of carbon dioxide (CO). A September 2021 study using satellite data estimated the CO2 emissions of the fires from November 2019 to January 2020 to be ~715 million tons, about twice as much as earlier estimates. While the carbon emitted by the fires would normally be reabsorbed by forest regrowth, this would take decades and might not happen at all if prolonged drought has damaged the ability of forests to fully regrow.

In December 2019, the air quality index (AQI) around Rozelle, an inner suburb of Sydney, hit 2,552 or more than 12 times the hazardous level of 200. On 1 January 2020, the AQI around Monash, a suburb of Canberra, was measured at 4,650, or more than 23 times hazardous level and peaked at 7,700.

On New Year's Day 2020 in New Zealand, a blanket of smoke from the Australian fires covered the whole South Island, giving the sky an orange-yellow haze. People in Dunedin reported smelling smoke in the air. The MetService stated that the smoke would not have any adverse affects on the weather or temperature in the country. The smoke moved over the North Island the following day, but began breaking up and was not as intense as it was over the South Island the previous day; meanwhile, wind from the South Pacific Ocean dissipated the smoke over the South Island. The smoke affected glaciers in the country, giving a brown tint to the snow. On 5 January 2020, more smoke wafted over the North Island, turning the sky in Auckland orange.

Ecological effects 

Prof. Chris Dickman, a fellow of the Australian Academy of Science from the University of Sydney, estimated on 8 January 2020 that more than one billion animals were killed by bushfires in Australia; while more than 800 million animals perished in New South Wales. The estimate was based on a 2007 World Wide Fund for Nature (WWF) report on impacts of land clearing on Australian wildlife in New South Wales that provided estimates of mammal, bird and reptile population density in the region. Dickman's calculation had been based on conservative estimates and the actual mortality could be higher. The figure provided by Dickman included mammals (excluding bats), birds, and reptiles; and did not include frogs, insects, or other invertebrates. Other estimates, which include animals like bats, amphibians and invertebrates, also put the number killed at over a billion.

A 2020 study estimated that at least 3 billion terrestrial vertebrates alone were displaced or killed by the fires, with reptiles (which tend to have higher population densities in affected areas compared to other vertebrates) comprising over two-thirds of the affected, with birds, mammals, and amphibians comprising the other third.

Ecologists feared some endangered species were driven to extinction by the fires. Though bushfires are not uncommon in Australia, they are usually of a lower scale and intensity that only affect small parts of the overall distribution of where species live. Animals that survived a bushfire could still find suitable habitats in the immediate vicinity, which was not the case when an entire distribution is decimated in an intense event. Besides immediate mortality from the fires, there were on-going mortalities after the fires from starvation, lack of shelter, and attacks from predators such as foxes and feral cats that are attracted to fire-affected areas to hunt. At least one species, the Kate's leaf-tailed gecko, had the entirety of its habitat burnt by the fires, while the long-footed potoroo had over 82% habitat burnt. While many endangered species managed to persist through the fires, albeit with severely impacted populations that will not survive in the long-term without major human influence, other species such as the Kangaroo Island micro-trapdoor spider and the Kangaroo Island assassin spider have not been sighted since.

On Kangaroo Island, Australia's third-largest island and known as Australia's "Galapagos Island", a third of the island was burnt. Large parts of the island are designated as protected areas and host animals such as sea lions, penguins, kangaroos, koalas, pygmy possums, southern brown bandicoots, Ligurian bees, Kangaroo Island dunnarts and various birds including glossy black cockatoos. NASA estimated that the number of dead koalas could be as high as 25,000 or about half the total population of the species on the island. A quarter of the beehives of the Ligurian honey bees that inhabited the Island were believed to have been destroyed. Both the Kangaroo Island dunnart and Kangaroo Island subspecies of the glossy black cockatoo are endangered and are only found on Kangaroo Island. Before the fires, there were fewer than 500 Kangaroo Island dunnarts and about 380 Kangaroo Island glossy black cockatoos.

The loss of an estimated 8,000 koalas (Phascolarctos cinereus) caused concerns. They are considered vulnerable to extinction, though not functionally extinct.

Due to the extremely dry conditions, some remnant areas of rainforest that—unlike most Australian vegetation—have not evolved and adapted to fire, were burnt in 2019–2020. This may have permanently reduced the extent of the 80-million year old rainforests, which were already scarce due to previous land clearing for agriculture and logging. Smaller, isolated remnant pockets of rainforest were totally destroyed and unlikely to recover, leading to local extinctions of rainforest flora and fauna. It was notable that the normally wet rainforest areas on the margins of schlerophyll forest, did not perform their usual role as a barrier to the spread of fire but were burnt.

Moreover, the fires caused widespread phytoplankton blooms by causing oceanic deposition of wildfire aerosols, enhancing marine productivity. While these increased oceanic carbon dioxide uptake, the amount – estimated to be slightly more than 152±83.5 million tons – did not counterbalance the ~715 million tons of CO2 the fires emitted.

Archaeological effects 

Fire damaged 500-year-old rock art at Anaiwan in northern New South Wales, with the intense and rapid temperature change of the fires cracking the granite rock. This caused panels of art to fracture and fall off the huge boulders that contain the galleries of art.

At the Budj Bim heritage areas in Victoria the Gunditjmara people reported that when they inspected the site after fires moved across it, they found ancient channels and ponds that were newly visible after the fires burned much of the vegetation off the landscape.

After fire burnt out a creek on a property at Cobargo, NSW, on New Year's Eve, a boomerang carved by stone artefact was found.

Domestic response

New South Wales
The New South Wales Rural Fire Service is the lead agency for bush fires in New South Wales and formed the bulk of the primary response to the fires, mobilising thousands of firefighters and several hundred firefighting vehicles. They were heavily supported by Fire & Rescue New South Wales, as well as the NSW National Parks & Wildlife Service and the Forestry Corporation of NSW, who hold jurisdiction over national parks and forests across the state respectively. Additional local firefighting resources were also used from agencies such as Air Services Australia and Sydney Trains.

Numerous interstate agencies deployed firefighting resources into New South Wales, including several hundred firefighters from the Victorian Country Fire Authority, along with crews from the Melbourne Metropolitan Fire Brigade, the South Australian Country Fire Service, the South Australian Metropolitan Fire Service, the South Australian Department of Environment and Water, and the Queensland Fire and Emergency Service.

Despite the substantial loss of property and loss of life, firefighters as of January 2020 managed to save over 16,000 structures from direct fire impact in addition to countless lives.

Multiple other New South Wales emergency services assisted in the response, including NSW Ambulance that provided ongoing pre-hospital care to victims of the fires including firefighters, NSW Police that worked to ensure public safety was maintained through road closures and evacuations and the NSW State Emergency Service that assisted with logistical support. With brush-tailed rock-wallabies and much of the indigenous wildlife population in parts of New South Wales were left without food or water, the NSW National Parks & Wildlife Service airdropped approximately  vegetables on the known habitats. A joint operation by the NSW National Parks & Wildlife Service and NSW Rural Fire Service was mounted to protect the critically endangered Wollemia pines growing in Wollemi National Park. Fire retardant was dropped from air tankers, and an irrigation system was installed on the ground by specialist firefighters, who were lowered into the area by winches from helicopters.

Commonwealth
On 24 December 2019, the Morrison Government announced that volunteer firefighters employed in the Commonwealth public service would be offered at least 20 working days paid leave. On 29 December 2019, it announced that volunteer firefighters who have been called out for more than 10 days would be able to receive financial compensation. On 4 January 2020, it announced that it would lease four waterbombing planes including two long-range DC-10s and two medium-range for use by state and territory governments.

On 5 January 2020, the Prime Minister announced the establishment of the National Bushfire Recovery Agency, funded initially with 2 billion, under the control of former Australian Federal Police Commissioner, Andrew Colvin.

Military
On 5 December 2019, the Australian Defence Force (ADF) commenced Operation Bushfire Assist to support state fire services in logistics, planning, capability, and operational support. Activities the ADF has undertaken as part of the Operation have included Air Force aircraft transporting firefighters and their equipment interstate, Army and Navy helicopters transporting firefighters, conducting night fire mapping, impact assessments and search and rescue flights, use of various defence facilities as coordination and information centres and for catering and accommodation for firefighters, liaison between state and federal government services, reloading and refuelling for waterbombing aircraft, deployment of personnel to assess fire damage and severity, and provision of humanitarian supplies.

On 1 January 2020, the ADF deployed additional military staff establishing the Victorian Joint Task Force 646 (Army Reserve 4th Brigade) and the following day the New South Wales Joint Task Force 1110 (Army Reserve 5th Brigade). On 3 January 2020, HMAS Choules and MV Sycamore evacuated civilians from Mallacoota bound for Westernport.

On 4 January 2020, following a meeting of the National Security Committee, the Morrison Government announced a compulsory call-out of Army Reserve brigades to deploy up to 3,000 reserve personnel full-time to assist with in the Operation. Additionally, Defence announced that it would deploy HMAS Adelaide to support other Navy ships in evacuations and relief, as well additional Chinook helicopters and military transport aircraft to RAAF Base East Sale. The same day, Chinook helicopters evacuated civilians from Omeo; and Spartan aircraft evacuated civilians from Mallacoota on 5 January.

Community organizations
The response of volunteer organisations and charities was also considerable, with WIRES Wildlife Rescue working to rescue and treat injured wildlife, Rapid Relief Team Australia raising money for victims, providing meals for firefighters and assisting with two bulk water tankers, Team Rubicon Australia providing debris removal and helping with the cleanup of fire affected areas, the Animal Welfare League fundraising and assisting injured animals, and St John Ambulance Australia and Australian Red Cross providing support at evacuation centres across New South Wales.

On 1 December 2019 WWF-Australia launched the "Towards Two Billion Trees" plan to aid the koala bushfire recovery. It aims to stop excessive tree-clearing, protect the existing trees and forests, and restore native habitat that has been lost. The ten-point plan for the next ten years foresees to grow 1.56 billion new trees and save 780 million trees.

On 4 January 2020 Architects Assist was established, representing over 600 Australian architecture firms providing their services pro bono to the individuals and communities affected by the bushfires (together with approximately 1500 architecture student volunteers).

International response
Political figures from outside Australia including Donald Trump, Cory Booker, Hillary Clinton, Al Gore, Bernie Sanders, Greta Thunberg, and Elizabeth Warren all publicly commented about the fires. People in the entertainment industry such as Tina Arena, Patricia Arquette, Cate Blanchett, Russell Crowe, Ellen DeGeneres, Selena Gomez, Halsey, Nicole Kidman, Lizzo, Bette Midler, Pink, Margot Robbie, Paul Stanley, Jay Park, Jonathan Van Ness, and Phoebe Waller-Bridge also made statements about the fires. Some of the aforementioned people have also donated or raised funds.

On 4 January 2020, Queen Elizabeth and the Duke of Edinburgh sent a message of condolence to Governor-General David Hurley, sending their "thoughts and prayers to all Australians at this difficult time". The Queen indicated in her message that she was "deeply saddened" to hear of the fires and their devastating impact on the country, and expressed her thanks to emergency service workers. On 8 January 2020, Prince Charles issued a video message expressing his despair at the "appalling horror" of the fires. The Duke and Duchess of Cambridge and the Duke and Duchess of Sussex also issued messages to Australia, Princess Mary of Denmark, who is of Australian heritage, published an open letter where she and her husband, Crown Prince Frederik, expressed their condolences to the victims and respect for the firefighters.

International aid
Canada
Four deployments totalling 87 Canadian firefighters were sent through the Canadian Interagency Forest Fire Centre. It was the first time since 2009 that Canadian personnel were deployed to Australia. The Canadian government also sent a CC-17 plane of the Royal Canadian Air Force with 15 personnel on 27 January to further aid with transport and provide airlift support.

Fiji
The government of Fiji deployed the Fiji Military Forces humanitarian assistance and disaster relief platoon and engineers to assist in the bush fire rehabilitation.

France
On 6 January, French President Emmanuel Macron stated he could help out with the bushfires. A team of five French firefighting experts arrived in Australia on 9 January to determine possible options for French and European support.

Indonesia
On 1 February, (Satuan Setingkat Peloton) SST Zeni, an Army engineering platoon unit, would be dispatched to Australia. A total of 38 personnel, consist of 26 army engineers, 6 Korps Marinir personnel, 4 Air Force facility construction personnel, and 2 TNI Medical Department personnel. The team landed in RAAF Base Richmond in New South Wales on the same day, according to the Indonesian Embassy on 3 February 2020, the troops will be deployed on the Blue Mountains area.

Japan
On 15 January, the Japanese government sent two C-130 aircraft of the JASDF, along with 70 other Self-Defense Force personnel to assist in transport and other efforts in combating the bushfires. The aircraft left Komaki Air Base and flew to RAAF Base Richmond in New South Wales the next day.

Malaysia
On 5 January, Malaysia offered its assistance through a statement by Deputy Prime Minister Wan Azizah Wan Ismail. On 13 January, Malaysia officially deployed over forty firefighters to assist with the bushfires. Twenty others from government agencies would also be involved with the mission.

New Zealand
Over fifty New Zealanders were deployed to Australia in both direct fire fighting and support roles. In January 2020, New Zealand also deployed elements of the Royal New Zealand Air Force and New Zealand Army including three NH90 helicopters, two Army combat engineer sections, and a command element. A specialist six person animal disaster response team were deployed by non-profit Animal Evac New Zealand on 8 January to New South Wales, assisting with wildlife rescue and supported by SAFE. The team was the first international specialist animal rescuers to arrive and included vets, animal management officers as well as animal disaster and technical animal rescue experts. A second team of four arrived on 13 January. The teams partnered with local wildlife centres to successfully rescue and relocate several injured animals. as well as advising residents in fire danger zones on their animal evacuation plans.

Papua New Guinea
The Government of Papua New Guinea offered to send 1,000 military and other personnel to Australia to assist with the response to the bushfires. Australia accepted 100 Papua New Guinea Defence Force personnel.

The Philippines
The Philippine Red Cross pledged to donate $100K to Australia, while various Filipino personalities pledged support for the victims of the bush fires. The women-led Teduray people of Maguindanao initiated a sacred rain-making ritual for Australian victims, calling on the fire goddess Frayag Sarif's intercession to bring rain to the country.

Singapore
Singapore deployed two Chinook helicopters and 42 Singapore Armed Forces personnel stationed at Oakey Army Aviation Centre to RAAF Base East Sale in Victoria.

United Arab Emirates
The United Arab Emirates sent 200 volunteers from the Emirates Red Crescent to help fight the fire, including Emirati astronaut Sultan Al Neyadi. A Twitter campaign and hashtag #mateshelpmates was launched by the Dubai Expo 2020 aiming to raise donations to help those affected by the fires in Australia. To increase awareness, Burj Khalifa in Dubai, the world's tallest tower, lit up in solidarity with Australia.

United States

The United States deployed 362 firefighters, including 222 from the United States Department of the Interior, to Australia to help combat the fires. Firefighters from other parts of the US also helped with the fires., On 23 January, three US firefighters died in the crash of a C-130 fire fighting aircraft, north east of Cooma in New South Wales.

Other countries
Several other countries have offered assistance:
On 7 January, Denmark offered 50 firefighters via the Danish Emergency Management Agency that were on a standby and could move on a short notice, but it was deemed unnecessary by the Australian Government, which at that point said that they had sufficient material, manpower and organisation to deal with the remaining fires.
On 6 January 2020, the Romanian Ministry of Internal Affairs responded to the Civil Protection Mechanism (EUCPM) and prepared 70 firefighters to be deployed in Australia through the Emergency Response Coordination Centre (ERCC) of the European Union. Australia rejected this, as well as the EU call for more bushfire help. 
Turkish Foreign Minister Mevlüt Çavuşoğlu tweeted that Turkey is ready to provide all required assistance, while Turkey's Melbourne consulate donated $14,500 to Queensland Fire and Emergency Services. 
The Foreign Ministry of Ukraine notified Australia that the Ukrainian government is ready to send 200 seasoned firefighters to help fight the fires. Ukraine's Foreign Minister also noted that "The fires in Australia have not left the Ukrainians indifferent." 
Some Pacific nations have also stated that they could send some aid.

Causes 
Australia is one of the most fire-prone countries on earth, and bushfires form part of the natural cycle of its landscapes. However, factors such as climate trends, weather patterns and vegetation management by humans can all contribute to the intensity of bushfire seasons, and the most destructive fires in Australian history have usually been preceded by extreme high temperatures, low relative humidity and strong winds, which combine to create ideal conditions for the rapid spread of fire.

Scientific experts and land management agencies agree that severely below average fuel moisture attributed to record-breaking temperatures and drought, accompanied by severe fire weather, are the primary causes of the 2019–20 Australian bushfire season, and that these are likely to have been exacerbated by long-term trends of warmer and drier weather observed over the Australian land mass. Nonetheless, the political nature of many of the crisis and its associated issues has also resulted in the circulation of large amounts of disinformation regarding the causes of the fire activity, to the neglect of credible scientific research, expert opinion, and previous government inquiries.

Ignition

Lightning was the major cause of ignition of fires during the 2019–20 fire crisis in NSW and Victoria.  The official NSW Bushfires Inquiry (with advice from the New South Wales Rural Fire Service) concluded "Lightning, often in remote areas, started most of the bush fires that became very large, damaging and hard to suppress."

The NSW Bushfire Inquiry report found that, while thunderstorm activity was comparable to a normal year, lightning strikes were more likely to start a fire due to hot, dry conditions. Additionally, some fires became so large they generated Pyrocumulus clouds and dry lightning, sparking more blazes.

The Inquiry also noted a small percentage of fires started from human causes, (including powerlines, machinery and amateur hazard reduction burns on private rural properties) but that fires caused by suspected arson were a "very small proportion of the area burnt".

Further, ABC News reported arson was of little impact – accounting for around 1% of NSW fires and 0.3% of Victorian fires by 18 January 2020. The NSW Rural Fire Service referred numerous individuals to the NSW Police; 24 people were charged with arson, allegedly starting bushfires. Queensland police reported that 114 out of 1,068 fires "were found to be deliberately or maliciously lit".

Drought and temperature
A likely contributor to the bushfire crisis was the ongoing drought in eastern Australiathe most severe on record for some fire affected areas. Exacerbating the effects of diminished rainfall in this drought has been a record breaking run of above average monthly temperatures, lasting 36 months to October 2019. The combination of heat and drought caused critical low fuel moisture content, with Victoria Country Fire Authority Response Controller Gavin Freeman stating that the "underlying dryness" of the bush has led to exceptionally high fire danger. The Commonwealth Scientific and Industrial Research Organisation (CSIRO) stated that on account of projected future climate change, hot days will become more frequent and hotter (very high confidence), and the time in drought is projected to increase over southern Australia (high confidence). In October 2019 David Littleproud, the Australian Minister for Water Resources, stated that he "totally accepts" the link between climate change and drought in Australia, as someone who has experienced it first hand.

Climate change

Climate and fire experts agree that climate change is a factor known to result in increased fire frequency and intensity in south east Australia, and although it should not be considered as the sole cause of the 2019–20 Australian fires, climate change is considered very likely to have contributed to the unprecedented extent and severity of the fires.

Australian scientific organisations, including the CSIRO clearly acknowledged the role of climate change and record drought in the unprecedented bushfire season. The Australian Academy of Science stated "The scientific evidence base shows that as the world warms due to human induced climate change, we experience an increase in the frequency and severity of extreme weather events."

The crisis has led to calls for more action to combat climate change. In December 2019, Australia had been ranked worst in terms of policy, and sixth worst overall, out of 57 countries assessed on the Climate Change Performance Index, with the Morrison government labelled "an increasingly regressive force." Originally downplaying the role of climate change in causing the fires, Prime Minister Morrison eventually conceded that climate change was one of "many factors" involved and added that Australia was "playing its part" in the international effort against climate change. That said, the Morrison Government has received some criticism on its 2030 emission reduction targets. Several members of the governing Liberal Party were criticised internationally for climate change denial, with backbencher Craig Kelly called "disgraceful" during an interview with the hosts of Good Morning Britain for denying any link between climate change and the fires, and the Israeli Public Broadcasting Corporation receiving "angry" feedback from listeners after airing an interview in which former Liberal prime minister Tony Abbott said the world was "in the grip of a climate cult." Prior to the worst phases of the bushfires, in an interview in November 2019, former Liberal prime minister Malcolm Turnbull said the party had struggled with the issue of climate change denial for more than a decade because it had become an issue of "identity" rather than fact, and criticised News Corporation for being a "long-time promoter" of climate denialism. The chief executive of the Council of Small Business Organisations Australia said bushfire preparations had been "stymied" by the federal government, because "there are people within government who firmly believe there is no such thing as climate change or that human beings don't have an impact upon it, and they are adamant that no extra work or extra effort should ever happen because they don't believe in climate change."

The NSW Bushfire Inquiry into the causes of the fires published their findings in July 2020. The Inquiry found that climate change played a major role in the summer's fires.

Public reaction and speculation over causes
During, and immediately after the crisis, Australian public concern over climate change increased, reflecting the scientific evidence that climate change had exacerbated the fires. This increased criticism of the conservative government's climate policy. Protests were held in the midst of the crisis, although some were criticised for their timing and use of resources, including by the Victorian Premier Daniel Andrews.

Conservative politicians and media primarily blamed a lack of prescribed burning and fire break management, although such assertion has subsequently been heavily criticised and disproven by scientific experts. Accompanying this was a claim that environmental groups were responsible for the crisis by inhibiting prescribed burning, despite environmental groups holding negligible political power.

Furthermore, the amount of prescribed burning in southeastern Australia has been stated to have increased in recent years, following the recommendation for increased prescribed burning from the 2009 Black Saturday Royal Commission. Experts suggested that prescribed burning has been more difficult to achieve given recent trends towards warmer and dryer conditions. Experts have also cast skepticism on the effectiveness of fuel reduction treatments, citing research that suggests that prescribed burning does little to stop bushfire and save property in south east Australia, with climate and weather conditions having primary influence.

The effect of previous prescribed burns in slowing the 2019–20 Australian fires and assisting fire suppression efforts remains unclear, although in many instances the fires were observed to burn through cleared agricultural land and forest recently affected by unplanned and prescribed burns, owing to the extreme weather conditions and dryness of vegetation. Of particular note, the damaging Currowan fire burnt through a large area of Morton National Park subject in 2017 to one of the largest prescribed burns ever successfully conducted in NSW. In relation to the blame of prescribed burning, Professor of Pyrogeography and Fire Science David Bowman stated "These are very tired and very old conspiracy theories that get a run after most major fires," and that they were "an obvious attempt to deflect the conversation away from climate change." In the lead up to another Federal inquiry into state land management, Professor of Bushfire Behaviour and Management Trent Penman added "If there was a silver bullet on bushfires we'd have found it by now, after the 51 [bushfire] inquiries since 1939," and that "blindly putting money into prescribed burning won't stop the problem". Despite evidence to suggest that fuel loads played a minimal role in the 2019–20 Australian fires, there are calls to open up Australian protected lands to industry, particularly logging and grazing, to reduce fire fuel, with these calls having so far mainly stemmed from individuals and businesses with interests in such industries, and have resulted in the circulation of large amounts of disinformation.

Misinformation and contested reporting 
During, and immediately after the fire season, misinformation and false reports circulated on various commercial media outlets and social media, including claims about the extent of the fires, its precedents and causes, and matters like funding of fire fighting services.

 Misleading maps and graphics

A number of maps giving an exaggerated impression of Australia's fires went viral online, and were published by major news outlets. It was reported by news.com.au that "Some bushfire maps have been criticised for misleading people about the location and size of the fires, with a map used by the ABC in the US appearing to show the entire east coast of Australia on fire, as well as a strange line of fires through the centre of the country... " One image created by Anthony Hearsey spread widely on Twitter and by celebrities including Rihanna was wrongly interpreted as a map showing the live extent of fires, when in fact it sought to present one month of data of locations where fire was detected, according to NASA's Fire Information for Resource Management System. Maps showing "hotspots" were spread online as comprehensive fire maps, giving an exaggerated impression of the extent of fires. Photographs of previous Australian bushfires were also being wrongly published as current and maps that exaggerate the extent of the fires, or include both past and present fires.

 Exaggerated extent of arson

The Guardian reported "Bot and troll accounts are involved in a 'disinformation campaign' exaggerating the role of arson in Australia's bushfire disaster, social media analysis suggests... The false claims are, in some cases, used to undermine the link between the current bushfires and the longer, more intense fire seasons brought about by climate change." The report cited a study by Queensland University of Technology senior lecturer on social network analysis Dr Timothy Graham, who examined content published on the #arsonemergency hashtag on Twitter. Giovanni Torre wrote for The Telegraph that "Australia's bushfire crisis has led to what appears to be a deliberate misinformation campaign started by climate-change deniers claiming arson is the primary cause of the ongoing fires...

Social media accounts, including Donald Trump Jr's Twitter account, circulated the false claim that 183 people had been arrested for arson during the Australian fire crisis..."  In 2021, the Australian Press Council determined the news report that 183 arsonists had been arrested "was not misleading".  183 people were subject to legal action, but only 24 for "deliberately-lit bushfires". An opinion piece for The Conversation website stated "In the first week of 2020, hashtag #ArsonEmergency became the focal point of a new online narrative surrounding the bushfire crisis. The message: the cause is arson, not climate change. Police and bushfire services (and some journalists) have contradicted this claim [...] We’ve observed both troll and bot accounts spouting disinformation regarding the bushfires on Twitter." The article also argued that a disinformation was underway to downplay the role of climate change in causing the fires. The vice.com website wrote "Research conducted by the Queensland University of Technology showed that Twitter accounts with the characteristics of bots or trolls were spreading disinformation about the responsibility of arsonists and Greens." The Guardian accused News Corp of furthering arson disinformation.

RMIT's FactCheck found no evidence to support the claims of arson being a major factor in the bushfires.

 Funding for the Rural Fire Service

Incorrect reports were disseminated that the New South Wales Government, led by Premier Gladys Berejiklian, had cut funding to fire services. NSW Rural Fire Service Commissioner Shane Fitzsimmons, in response to the funding cut claims, stated "that it is rubbish, it is misinformation, it's being misrepresented and I think it is disgracefully being misrepresented here today". He also stated that "not only has our budget not been cut, we are enjoying record budgets. We have got more money today than we have ever had before in the history of the organisation". Debate and controversy continue to surround previous funding cuts to fire management agencies, with other reports noting recent funding cuts to the National Parks & Wildlife Service, which is responsible for the planning and enforcement of prescribed burns in NSW national parks.

 Hazard reduction

Along with other misinformation, claims were made that Australian Greens politicians had control over - and blocked - hazard reduction efforts by fire services. The Greens' policy supports hazard reduction, and did so at the time. Additionally, as state governments are responsible for fire management, and the Greens at the time held only a small percent of seats in any state parliament, it is unclear how they could have had any control over fire management practices.

However, as The Guardian reports "Despite the evidence, a claim persists that a major contributing factor of Australia's devastating fire season... is not climate change but a conspiracy by environmentalists to 'lock up' national parks and prevent hazard reduction activities such as prescribed burning and clearing of the forest floor".

 Other false reports

 Fires would clear land to benefit a high-speed rail project.
 Islamic State was somehow responsible or involved.
 The fires were a false flag operation deliberately lit by climate change activists.

Political response

Ongoing political and social debate has surrounded many aspects of the 2019–20 Australian fire crisis, particularly regarding the causes and future prevention of such fire activity, and the role of climate change. Amid a conservative government that has received noted criticism for its climate change inaction and support for fossil fuel industries, growing acknowledgement within the nation's politics and society of the issue of climate change in Australia resulted in a highly political agenda to the crisis response. The governing Liberal and National parties, accompanied by numerous news outlets associated with climate change denial, firmly deflected responsibility away from the record-breaking drought affecting the country and its associated links to climate change observations and projections.

Conversely, scientific experts have asserted the influence of climate change, drought, prolonged fire weather, and contextualised the limited role of prescribed burning and arson in influencing the crisis. The political and social response to the crisis has been marked notably by political blame shifting, the circulation of large amounts of disinformation, and political disregard for scientific research, expert opinion, and previous government inquiries.

On 24 January, NSW Premier Gladys Berejiklian and NSW Rural Fire Service Commissioner Shane Fitzsimmons announced a state memorial for people impacted by the bushfires in New South Wales, which was held on 23 February at Sydney Olympic Park.

Criticism and controversy 

Further controversy surrounded prime minister Scott Morrison for taking an overseas family holiday to Hawaii, United States, during the bushfires. These criticisms also applied to New South Wales Minister for Emergency Services David Elliot, who went for a holiday in Europe. Queensland Premier Annastacia Palaszczuk was also criticised for holidaying on a cruise ship while fires were active in the state.

While travelling throughout fire-affected towns in New South Wales, Morrison was filmed attempting to shake the hands of two residents in Cobargo who had refused to shake his outstretched hand. Morrison was criticised for grabbing and then shaking their hands despite their refusals. In an interview with Andrew Constance, NSW Liberal MP for Bega, Constance described the incident stating "the locals probably gave him the welcome he probably deserved". Morrison did not appear concerned with the criticism, later stating, "people are angry, and if people want to direct that at me, that is up to them".

On 4 January, volunteer firefighter Paul Parker, from Nelligen, rose to fame after he stopped his firetruck next to a Channel 7 news crew, and used colourful language to denounce what he perceived as an inadequate response by Morrison.

Soon after, Morrison released a video on behalf of the Liberal Party regarding deployment of military assets to respond to the bushfire crisis, for which he was widely criticised. The video was perceived as an inappropriate and an untimely political advertisement, with former ABC broadcaster Barrie Cassidy calling it "absolutely obscene," journalist Peter van Onselen saying it was "beyond inappropriate", and British political commentator Piers Morgan characterising it as "one of the most tone-deaf things I've ever seen a country's leader put out during a crisis." The Australian Defence Association, a public-interest watchdog dealing with defence issues, said the video was "milking ADF support to civil agencies fighting bushfires" and was a "clear breach of the (reciprocal) non-partisanship convention applying to both the ADF & Ministers/MPs." NSW Rural Fire Service Commissioner Fitzsimmons said it was "disappointing" to learn of the announcement of military assistance from the media and not the government directly. Morrison was further criticised for a "donate" button on a Liberal Party website page which misleadingly led to a donations page for the Liberal Party itself, rather than bushfire relief; the button was later removed.

English writer and journalist Jeremy Clarkson was reprimanded for writing a column that stated "God didn't want people to live in Australia", where he suggested Anglo Australian residents to "come home" because Australia is "God's laboratory" and is a "place far, far away where he could house all his experiments that had gone wrong". He then concluded, "Plainly, God is embarrassed. Because he's decided to set fire to it...which means people must accept that Australia isn't meant for human habitation". Although Clarkson was attempting to be humorous with his comments, he was heavily criticised on social media for being insensitive and disrespectful to the victims.

Royal commission and other inquiries

On 12 January 2020, the Prime Minister, Scott Morrison outlined a proposal to establish a royal commission into the bushfires. Requiring the approval of the state and territory governments, the Commonwealth Government drafted terms of reference. A number of organisations raised objections to the commission of inquiry, citing cost, length and the emotionally exhausting process; and that previous inquiries had failed to implement many of their recommendations. On 20 February 2020, Morrison released the letters patent confirming the establishment of the Royal Commission into National Natural Disaster Arrangements, chaired by Air Chief Marshal Mark Binskin  (Retd), a former Chief of the Australian Defence Force, and supported by the Hon Dr Annabelle Bennett  and Professor Andrew Macintosh, a specialist in climate risk and impact management. The final report was published on 30 October 2020, and contained 80 recommendations across 21 topics.

On 5 December 2019 David Littleproud, the Minister for natural disasters and emergency management, announced that the House of Representatives Standing Committee on the Environment and Energy would conduct an inquiry into the ‘efficacy of past and current vegetation and land management policy, practice and legislation and their effect on the intensity and frequency of bushfires and subsequent risk to property, life and the environment’. The Royal Commission's report was presented to the Governor-General on 28 October 2020 and published on 30 October 2020. On 14 January 2020, the Victorian Premier, Daniel Andrews, announced an independent investigation into the 2019–2020 bushfire season in Victoria. On 31 January 2020, the NSW Premier, Gladys Berejiklian announced an independent investigation to review the causes, preparation and response to the bushfires in New South Wales.

Other names
The term black summer has become a common term for the 201920 bushfire season, for example, the Australian Red Cross uses this phrase as a blanket term for the fires. An episode of Four Corners titled Black Summer comprised an audio-visual media collation of material provided by people impacted by bushfires and was broadcast in early February 2020. The Prime Minister, Scott Morrison, in an address to the Australian Parliament labelled the bushfire season as the black summer as he outlined a proposal to establish a royal commission into the bushfires:

Donations
Philanthropists, corporate organisations, celebrities, and sportspeople donated to various fundraising appeals for bushfire victims and firefighters; estimated to total 500 million as of 19 January 2020. Following a representative sample, a report issued by the Fundraising Institute of Australia estimated that 53 percent of all adult Australians donated to a bushfire appeal. 

Andrew Forrest and his wife, Nicola, donated A$70 million; and the Paul Ramsay Foundation donated A$30 million. In November, James Packer pledged 1 million to support the NSWRFS. As the impact of the bushfire season spread, the Crown Resorts Foundation and the Packer family Foundation pledged a further 4 million to volunteer fire services in NSW, Victoria and Western Australia – all states in which Crown has resorts. The Murdoch family donated A$5 million; the Micky and Madeleine Arison Family Foundation, A$1.5 million; and donations of A$1 million each were received from the Pratt Foundation, John and Pauline Gandel, Mike Cannon-Brookes, Scott Farquhar, and the Haines and the Perich families. Justin Hemmes donated A$500,000.

Corporate organisations to make donations or pledges included the Seven Group and Kerry Stokes' private investment firm, ACE Capital Equity, a combined total of A$10 million; Tim Cook from Apple, an undisclosed amount; the NAB and News Corp Australia, A$5 million each; Coles Group, A$4 million (of which A$3 million was in gift cards); the Australian Football League, A$2.5 million; BHP, A$2 million; Westpac and Woolworths, A$1.5 million each; Facebook, A$1.25 million; and Amazon, the ANZ Bank, the Atlassian Foundation, the Commonwealth Bank, Orica, Qantas, and Rio Tinto, A$1 million each; and Canva and the San Diego Zoo, A$500,000 each.

Leonardo DiCaprio donated 3 million (3.4 million) via Earth Alliance; Kylie Jenner, 1 million; Ellen DeGeneres, A$1.5 million; and donations of A$1 million were received from Sir Elton John and Chris Hemsworth and family. Pink donated US$500,000 (720,000), tweeting that she is "totally devastated watching what is happening in Australia right now." Metallica donated 750,000; and donations of 500,000 were received from Nicole Kidman and her husband, Keith Urban, Kylie and Dannii Minogue and their family, and Bette Midler. The Wiggles performed a concert on 17 and 18 January, and on 16 February at Stadium Australia in Sydney, the Fire Fight Australia concert featured local and international acts. The Down to Earth benefit concert raised over A$1 million and featured performances from Angus & Julia Stone, Tash Sultana, Gang Of Youths, and others.

Tennis players, led by Nick Kyrgios, pledged to donate money for every ace served during the Australian summer of tennis. Many cricket players, such as international representatives Chris Lynn, Glenn Maxwell, D'Arcy Short, Matthew Renshaw and Fawad Ahmed pledged to donate money for every wicket and/or six during the remainder of the Australian cricket season. Shane Warne and Jeff Thomson, retired Australian cricketers, donated their baggy green Test cricket caps and Thomson also donated a playing vest for online auction. Warne's cap was purchased by the Commonwealth Bank with a bid of A$1,007,500; and Russell Crowe's Rabbitohs cap was auctioned with a winning bid in excess of A$500,000. Footballer Mathew Ryan, goalkeeper for Premier League club Brighton & Hove Albion and the Australia national team announced he'll donate $500 for every registered save by an English Premier League goalkeeper on the weekend of 11–12 January 2020. Australian stars who were playing in the 2019–20 NBA season collectively donated in excess of A$1 million; and Lewis Hamilton, a Formula One driver, donated 500,000.

Comedian Celeste Barber launched a fundraising appeal with a target of raising 15,000, however it went on to raise over 50 million, making it the largest fundraiser ever held on Facebook. A telethon conducted with the Sydney New Year's Eve fireworks raised more than 2 million.

Irish YouTuber Jacksepticeye raised over $200,000 on 26 January through a charity live stream.

They have given all the profits from 23 January 2020 to the Reforest New project. The trees are being planted in Byron Bay.

F1 Delta Time, a blockchain game developed and published by Animoca Brands, raised 51 ether (ETH) in its charity auction by selling the "Australia Edition 2020" non-fungible token, which is a digital race car that is officially licensed by Formula One. All of the proceeds were split evenly between the NSW Rural Fire Service Association, NSW Wildlife Information Rescue and Education Service, and Australian Red Cross Disaster Relief and Recovery Fund.

Scams and fraud 

Multiple media outlets reported that the Australian Competition & Consumer Commission received 86 reports of bushfire-related scams. It came as increased requests for cash driven donations leveraging crowdfunding platforms like GoFundMe, or as a result of false links posted on Twitter. It prompted some organisations to provide a list of approved and vetted charities online to reduce fraud.

In January 2020 a parliamentary inquiry into the NSW government's council grants scandal was expanded to scrutinise allegations of pork barrelling after it was revealed only $2.5 million of the $177 million first round relief fund was allocated to NSW Labor-held seats. Although the practice is not illegal in Australia it has been widely perceived as a form of sanctioned corrupt conduct.

See also 

 2020s in political history
 2020s in environmental history

 Climate of Australia
 
 List of fires and impacts of the 2019-20 Australian bushfire season
 List of major bushfires in Australia
 List of natural disasters in Australia
 List of wildfires
 List of largest fires of the 21st-century

Notes

References

External links

 EarthWindMap – Current global map of airborne particulates less than 1 micrometre in diameter, including smoke, centred on Australia
 MyFireWatch – Government of Western Australia site mapping fires and vegetation every 2–4 hours from satellite data
 A collection of articles, ahead of a new series entitled The frontline: inside Australia's climate emergency.
How heat and drought turned Australia into a tinderbox ABC News (19 February 2020). Storyline covering events, with satellite imagery.

2010s in New South Wales
2010s in Queensland
2010s in South Australia
2010s in Tasmania
2010s in Victoria (Australia)
2010s in Western Australia
2019 disasters in Australia
Australian bushfire season
2020 disasters in Australia
Australian bushfire season
2020s in New South Wales
2020s in South Australia
2020s in Tasmania
2020s in Victoria (Australia)
2020s in Western Australia
Bushfire seasons in Australia
2020s in the Australian Capital Territory
Climate change in Australia
Climate change controversies 
2020 fires in Oceania 
2019 fires in Oceania